Roy Don Reeves (born February 8, 1946) is a former professional American football wide receiver in the National Football League. He attended South Carolina and played with the Buffalo Bills in 1969.

External links
Pro-Football Reference

1946 births
Living people
People from Americus, Georgia
Players of American football from Georgia (U.S. state)
Buffalo Bills players
South Carolina Gamecocks football players
American football wide receivers